The Best of Cameo is a compilation album released by the funk/R&B group Cameo in 2004. It is not to be confused with the 1993 release The Best of Cameo. However, it is a repackaging of the 1998 issue of Best of Cameo, but with "The" added to the album's title, even using the same cover art. A more complete, career-spanning compilation, Gold, was released in 2005. <

Track listing
 "She's Strange" – Blackmon, Jenkins, Leftenant, Singleton
 "I Just Want to Be" – Blackmon, Johnson
 "Shake Your Pants" – Blackmon
 "I'll Always Stay" – Blackmon, Lockett
 "Flirt" – Blackmon, Jenkins
 "I Like It" – Blackmon, Campbell, Lockett, Mills
 "Be Yourself" – Blackmon, Jenkins
 "I Care for You" – Blackmon, Jenkins, Singleton
 "Feel Me" – Blackmon, Lockett
 "Keep It Hot" – Blackmon, Lockett
 "The Rock" – Blackmon

References

Cameo (band) compilation albums
2004 greatest hits albums